Dicynodontia is an extinct clade of anomodonts, an extinct type of non-mammalian therapsid. Dicynodonts were herbivorous animals with a pair of tusks, hence their name, which means 'two dog tooth'. Members of the group possessed a horny, typically toothless beak, unique amongst all synapsids. Dicynodonts first appeared in Southern Pangaea during the mid-Permian, ca. 270–260 million years ago, and became globally distributed and the dominant herbivorous animals in the Late Permian, ca. 260–252 Mya. They were devastated by the end-Permian Extinction that wiped out most other therapsids ca. 252 Mya. They rebounded during the Triassic but died out towards the end of that period. They were the most successful and diverse of the non-mammalian therapsids, with over 70 genera known, varying from rat-sized burrowers to elephant-sized browsers.

Characteristics

The dicynodont skull is highly specialised, light but strong, with the synapsid temporal openings at the rear of the skull greatly enlarged to accommodate larger jaw muscles. The front of the skull and the lower jaw are generally narrow and, in all but a number of primitive forms, toothless. Instead, the front of the mouth is equipped with a horny beak, as in turtles and ceratopsian dinosaurs. Food was processed by the retraction of the lower jaw when the mouth closed, producing a powerful shearing action, which would have enabled dicynodonts to cope with tough plant material. Many genera also have a pair of tusks, which it is thought may have been an example of sexual dimorphism. Several genera, such as Stahleckeria, that lacked true tusks instead bore tusk-like extensions on the side of the beak.

The body is short, strong and barrel-shaped, with strong limbs. In large genera (such as Dinodontosaurus) the hindlimbs were held erect, but the forelimbs bent at the elbow. Both the pectoral girdle and the ilium are large and strong. The tail is short.

Endothermy and hair
Dicynodonts have long been suspected of being warm-blooded animals. Their bones are highly vascularised and possess Haversian canals, and their bodily proportions are conducive to heat preservation. In young specimens, the bones are so highly vascularised that they exhibit higher channel densities than most other therapsids. Yet, studies on Late Triassic dicynodont coprolites paradoxically showcase digestive patterns more typical of animals with slow metabolisms.

More recently, the discovery of hair remnants in Permian coprolites possibly vindicates the status of dicynodonts as endothermic animals. As these coprolites come from carnivorous species and digested dicynodont bones are abundant, it has been suggested that at least some of these hair remnants come from dicynodont prey. A new study using chemical analysis seemed to suggest that cynodonts and dicynodonts both developed warm blood independently before the Permian extinction.

Feet
Pentasauropus dicynodont tracks suggest that dicynodonts had fleshy pads on their feet.

Tusks
Dicynodonts are the only vertebrates beside mammals to have true tusks. Their development prior to the evolution of the mammalian tooth replacement offers an insight into the acquisition of tusks.

History

Dicynodonts have been known since the mid-1800s. The South African geologist Andrew Geddes Bain gave the first description of dicynodonts in 1845. At the time, Bain was a supervisor for the construction of military roads under the Corps of Royal Engineers and had found many reptilian fossils during his surveys of South Africa. Bain described these fossils in an 1845 letter published in Transactions of the Geological Society of London, calling them "bidentals" for their two prominent tusks. In that same year, the English paleontologist Richard Owen named two species of dicynodonts from South Africa: Dicynodon lacerticeps and Dicynodon bainii. Since Bain was preoccupied with the Corps of Royal Engineers, he wanted Owen to describe his fossils more extensively. Owen did not publish a description until 1876 in his Descriptive and Illustrated Catalogue of the Fossil Reptilia of South Africa in the Collection of the British Museum. By this time, many more dicynodonts had been described. In 1859, another important species called Ptychognathus declivis was named from South Africa. In the same year, Owen named the group Dicynodontia. In his Descriptive and Illustrated Catalogue, Owen honored Bain by erecting Bidentalia as a replacement name for his Dicynodontia. The name Bidentalia quickly fell out of use in the following years, replaced by popularity of Owen's Dicynodontia.

Evolutionary history

Dicynodonts first appeared during the Middle Permian in the Southern Hemisphere, with South Africa being the centre of their known diversity, and underwent a rapid evolutionary radiation, becoming globally distributed and amongst the most successful and abundant land vertebrates during the Late Permian. During this time, they included a large variety of ecotypes, including large, medium-sized, and small herbivores and short-limbed mole-like burrowers.

Only four lineages are known to have survived the Great Dying; the first three represented with a single genus each: Myosaurus, Kombuisia, and Lystrosaurus, the latter being the most common and widespread herbivores of the Induan (earliest Triassic). None of these survived long into the Triassic. The fourth group was the Kannemeyeriiformes, the only dicynodonts who diversified during the Triassic. These stocky, pig- to ox-sized animals were the most abundant herbivores worldwide from the Olenekian to the Ladinian age. By the Carnian they had been supplanted by traversodont cynodonts and rhynchosaur reptiles. During the Norian (middle of the Late Triassic), perhaps due to increasing aridity, they drastically declined, and the role of large herbivores was taken over by sauropodomorph dinosaurs.

Fossils of an Asian elephant-sized dicynodont Lisowicia bojani discovered in Poland indicate that dicynodonts survived at least until the late Norian or earliest Rhaetian (latest Triassic); this animal was also the largest known dicynodont species.

Six fragments of fossil bone discovered in Queensland, Australia, were interpreted as remains of a skull in 2003. This suggested to indicate that dicynodonts survived into the Cretaceous in southern Gondwana. The dicynodont affinity of these specimens was questioned (including a proposal that they belonged to a baurusuchian crocodyliform by Agnolin et al. in 2010), and in 2019 Knutsen and Oerlemans considered this fossil to be of Plio-Pleistocene age, and reinterpreted it as a fossil of a large mammal, probably a diprotodontid.

With the decline and extinction of the kannemeyerids, there were to be no more dominant large synapsid herbivores until the middle Paleocene epoch (60 Ma) when mammals, distant descendants of cynodonts, began to diversify after the extinction of the non-avian dinosaurs.

Systematics

Taxonomy
Dicynodontia was originally named by the English paleontologist Richard Owen. It was erected as a family of the order Anomodontia and included the genera Dicynodon and Ptychognathus. Other groups of Anomodontia included Gnathodontia, which included Rhynchosaurus (now known to be an archosauromorph) and Cryptodontia, which included Oudenodon. Cryptodonts were distinguished from dicynodonts from their absence of tusks. Although it lacks tusks, Oudenodon is now classified as a dicynodont, and the name Cryptodontia is no longer used. Thomas Henry Huxley revised Owen's Dicynodontia as an order that included Dicynodon and Oudenodon. Dicynodontia was later ranked as a suborder or infraorder with the larger group Anomodontia, which is classified as an order. The ranking of Dicynodontia has varied in recent studies, with Ivakhnenko (2008) considering it a suborder, Ivanchnenko (2008) considering it an infraorder, and Kurkin (2010) considering it an order.

Many higher taxa, including infraorders and families, have been erected as a means of classifying the large number of dicynodont species. Cluver and King (1983) recognised several main groups within Dicynodontia, including Diictodontia, Endothiodontia, Eodicynodontia, Kingoriamorpha, Pristerodontia, and Venyukoviamorpha. Many families have been proposed, including Cistecephalidae, Diictodontidae, Dicynodontae, Emydopidae, Endothiodontidae, Kannemeyeriidae, Kingoriidae, Lystrosauridae, Myosauridae, Oudenodontidae, Pristerodontidae, and Robertiidae. However, with the rise of phylogenetics, most of these taxa are no longer considered valid. Kammerer and Angielczyk (2009) suggested that the problematic taxonomy and nomenclature of Dicynodontia and other groups results from the large number of conflicting studies and the tendency for invalid names to be mistakenly established.

Current classification 
Dicynodontia
Colobodectes
Eodicynodon
Endothiodontia
Abajudon
Endothiodon
Lanthanostegus
Niassodon
Eumantellidae
Eurychororhinus?
Pristerodon
Synostocephalus?
Therochelonia

Phylogeny
Below is a cladogram modified from Angielczyk and Rubidge (2010) showing the phylogenetic relationships of Dicynodontia:

Below is a cladogram from Kammerer et al. (2013). The data matrix of Kammerer et al. (2013), a list of characteristics that was used in the analysis, was based on that of Kammerer et al. (2011), which followed a comprehensive taxonomic revision of Dicynodon. Because of this, many of the relationships found by Kammerer et al. (2013) are the same as those found by Kammerer et al. (2011). However, several taxa were added to the analysis, including Tiarajudens Eubrachiosaurus, Shaanbeikannemeyeria, Zambiasaurus and many "outgroup" taxa (positioned outside Anomodontia), while other taxa were re-coded. As in Kammerer et al. (2011), the interrelationships of non-kannemeyeriiform dicynodontoids are weakly supported and thus vary between the analyses.

See also
 Dromasauria
 Evolution of mammals

References

Further reading
 Carroll, R. L. (1988), Vertebrate Paleontology and Evolution, WH Freeman & Co.
 Cox, B., Savage, R.J.G., Gardiner, B., Harrison, C. and Palmer, D. (1988) The Marshall illustrated encyclopedia of dinosaurs & prehistoric animals, 2nd Edition, Marshall Publishing
 King, Gillian M., "Anomodontia" Part 17 C, Encyclopedia of Paleoherpetology, Gutsav Fischer Verlag, Stuttgart and New York, 1988
 King, Gillian M., 1990, The Dicynodonts: A Study in Palaeobiology, Chapman and Hall, London and New York

External links
Therapsida : Neotherapsida : Dicynodontia - Palaeos

 
Guadalupian first appearances
Late Triassic extinctions
Taxa named by Richard Owen
Fossil taxa described in 1859